Alambrista! is a 1977 film directed by Robert M. Young and starring Domingo Ambriz and Trinidad Silva. It won four awards in 1977.

Cast
Domingo Ambriz as Roberto
Trinidad Silva as Joe
Linda Gillen as Sharon
Ned Beatty as Angelo Coyote
Jerry Hardin as Man in cafe
In 2003 it was re-edited and remastered with a new soundtrack by Jose "Dr. Loco" Cuellar, Greg Landau, Francisco Herrera and Tomas Montoya and was re-released with a book on University of New Mexico Press.

Awards
 Golden Camera - Cannes Film Festival (Robert M. Young)
 Interfilm Award - Mannheim-Heidelberg International Film Festival (Robert M. Young)
 Golden Seashell - San Sebastian International Film Festival (Robert M. Young)
 OCIC Award - San Sebastian International Film Festival (Robert M. Young)

References

External links

¡Alambrista!: Inside the Undocumented Experience an essay by Charles Ramírez Berg at the Criterion Collection

1977 films
Films directed by Robert M. Young
1977 drama films
Caméra d'Or winners
1970s English-language films